Ali ibn Kama, the uncle of the Buyid ruler Rukn al-Dawla and the latter's other brothers Mu'izz al-Dawla and Imad al-Dawla, was a Buyid military officer who became prominent among the Buyids of Jibal, and was greatly honored among his Daylamite kinsmen. At the death of Imad al-Dawla in 949, Ali was appointed as the viceroy of Ray by Rukn al-Dawla, who went to Shiraz to secure the succession of his son there, Adud al-Dawla. Meanwhile, the Samanids used this opportunity to invade the territories of Rukn al-Dawla, forcing Ali to flee from Jibal. About 959, a battle ensured between Ali and the Ziyarid prince Bisutun, which resulted in a Buyid victory. In 966, Ali and Rukn al-Dawla defeated a large force of ghazis who had arrived from Khorasan. Rukn al-Dawla later died in 976 and was succeeded by his son Fakhr al-Dawla, who had Ali executed.

Sources 
 
 

Buyid princes
10th-century Iranian politicians
976 deaths
10th-century births
Buyid generals